Raibolini is a surname. Notable people with the surname include:

Francesco Raibolini (1450–1517), Italian painter
Giacomo Raibolini (1484–1557), Italian painter
Giulio Raibolini (1487–1540), Italian painter

Italian-language surnames